Roy W. Johnson (June 19, 1882 – December 2, 1947) was a Nebraska politician who served as the 23rd lieutenant governor of Nebraska, from 1943–47. Johnson also served in the Nebraska Legislature from 1937–39 (34th district).

Johnson was born in Weeping Water, Nebraska in 1882. He graduated from high school in Sumner, Nebraska, and Lincoln Business College. He served on the school board in Sumner and in Buffalo County, Nebraska.  He defeated John R. Long in the November 1936 election for the 34th district of the Nebraska Legislature.  He failed to get re-nominated for a second term in the primary in August 1938.

He died of a heart attack while attending a convention in Chicago on December 2, 1947.

References

Lieutenant Governors of Nebraska
Republican Party Nebraska state senators
1947 deaths
1882 births
20th-century American politicians